Tribune Content Agency (TCA) is a syndication company owned by Tribune Publishing. TCA had previously been known as the Chicago Tribune Syndicate, the Chicago Tribune New York News Syndicate (CTNYNS), Tribune Company Syndicate, and Tribune Media Services. TCA is headquartered in Chicago, and had offices in various American cities (Milwaukee, Wisconsin; Queensbury, New York; Arlington, Texas; Santa Monica, California), the United Kingdom, the Netherlands, and Hong Kong.

History
Sidney Smith 's early comic strip The Gumps had a key role in the rise of syndication when Robert R. McCormick and Joseph Medill Patterson, who had both been publishing the Chicago Tribune since 1914, planned to launch a tabloid in New York, as comics historian Coulton Waugh explained:

Patterson founded the Chicago Tribune Syndicate in 1918, managed by Arthur Crawford. 

In 1933, Patterson (who was then based in New York and running the Daily News), launched the Chicago Tribune-Daily News Syndicate, Inc. (also known as the Chicago Tribune-New York News Syndicate and the Tribune-New York (Daily) News Syndicate).

An April 1933 article in Fortune described the "Big Four" American syndicates as United Feature Syndicate, King Features Syndicate, the Chicago Tribune Syndicate, and the Bell-McClure Syndicate. Mollie Slott kept the syndicate running in its mid-century glory days.

In 1968, the syndicate offered about 150 features to approximately 1400 client newspapers. 

Tribune Publishing acquired the Times Mirror Company in 2000, with the Los Angeles Times Syndicate being merged into Tribune Media Services.

In 2006 The McClatchy Company inherited a partnership with the Tribune Company, in the news service Knight Ridder-Tribune Information Services, when it acquired Knight Ridder; the new service was called the McClatchy-Tribune News Service (MCT). In 2014, Tribune bought out McClatchy's share of the company, taking full ownership of MCT and moving its headquarters to Chicago.

On June 25, 2013, the newspaper syndication News & Features division of Tribune Media Services became the Tribune Content Agency.

On June 12, 2014, Tribune Media Services was merged into Gracenote. After the 2014 split of Tribune Company assets between Tribune Media and Tribune Publishing, Gracenote went to Tribune Media (who would sell it to Nielsen Holdings in 2016) while Tribune Content Agency content remained with Tribune Publishing.

On September 22, 2014, the McClatchy-Tribune News Service (MCT) was renamed the Tribune News Service (TNS).

Products and Services
TCA distributes media products, such as news, columns, comic strips, Jumble and crosswords, printed insert books, video, and other information services to publications across the United States, Canada, and other countries in English and Spanish for both print and web syndication.

Tribune Premium Content is a subscription service for newspapers and other media channels. The content provided includes comics, puzzles, games, editorial cartoons, as well as feature content packages. Tribune Premium Content also syndicates content from other sources, such as The Atlantic, Rolling Stone, Kiplinger, Harvard Health and Mayo Clinic.

TCA's news service, Tribune News Service, offers breaking news, lifestyle and entertainment stories, sports and business articles, commentary, photos, graphics and illustrations.

Tribune SmartContent is an information service filtered to provide targeted content. Full-text news feeds deliver articles from 600 sources from around the world.

TCA also offered products and services for niche markets via TCA Specialty Products.

TCA has, worldwide, 600-plus contributors and serves more than 1,200 clients, services and resellers.

Management
 Wayne Lown, General Manager
 Rick DeChantal, Sales Director
 Pia Ingberg, Director, European Operations
 Mustafa Sharaan, Director of International Business Development
 Jack Barry, VP/Operations (and Acquisitions Editor)
 Zach Finken, Associate Editor
 Matt Maldre, Marketing Manager

Comic strips

Strips as of 2023
 9 to 5
 Animal Crackers
 Bliss by Harry Bliss
 Bottom Liners
 Bound and Gagged
 Brewster Rockit: Space Guy!
 Broom-Hilda
 Dick Tracy
 Gasoline Alley
 Gil Thorp
 Love Is...
 Middletons, The
 Pluggers

Discontinued strips

 The Adventures of Smilin' Jack by Zack Mosley (1933–1973)
 Aggie Mack / Aggie by Hal Rasmusson and Roy L. Fox (1946–1972)
 Beyond Mars by Jack Williamson & Lee Elias (February 17, 1952 – May 13, 1955)
 Bobby Make-Believe by Frank King (1915–1919)
 Brenda Starr, Reporter originally by Dale Messick (1940–2011)
 Ching Chow originally by Sidney Smith and Stanley Link (1927–1990)
 Closer Than We Think by Arthur Radebaugh (January 12, 1958 – January 6, 1963) — Sunday panel
 Compu-toon by Charles Boyce (1994–1997; moved to Universal Uclick)
 Conrad by Bill Schorr (1982–1986)
 Deathless Deer by Alicia Patterson and Neysa McMein (1942–1943)
 Dondi by Gus Edson and Irwin Hasen (1955–1986)
 Friday Foster by Jim Lawrence and later Jorge Longarón (1970–1974)
 The Gumps by Sidney Smith (1917–1959)
 Harold Teen by Carl Ed (1919–1959)
 Helen, Sweetheart of the Internet by Peter Zale (5 June 2000 – 25 December 2005)
 Housebroken (2002–2010)
 In the Bleachers by Steve Moore (1985–1995; moved to Universal Press Syndicate)
  Kennesaw by Reamer Keller (1953–1955)
 Li'l Abner by Al Capp (1964–1977) — moved over from United Feature Syndicate
 Little Joe originally by Ed Leffingwell (October 1, 1933–1972)
 Little Lulu (June 5, 1950 – May 1969) by Woody Kimbrell (1950–1964), Roger Armstrong (1964–1966), and Ed Nofziger (1966–1969) 
 Little Orphan Annie by Harold Gray and others (1924–2010)
 Lola by Todd Clark (1999–2005; moved to United Feature Syndicate)
 Lolly (later changed to Lolly and Pepper) by Pete Hansen (1955–1983)
 Louie by Harry Hanan (1947–1976)
 Mary Perkins, On Stage by Leonard Starr (February 1957 – September 9, 1979)
 Moon Mullins by Frank Willard & Ferd Johnson (1923–1991)
 Mother Goose and Grimm by Mike Peters (1984–2002; moved to King Features Syndicate)
 Motley's Crew by Ben Templeton and Tom Forman (1976–2000)
 Mount Pleasant by Rick McKee and Kent Sligh (2021-2023)
 My Son John by Bill Hoest (April 4 1960 – c. April 1962)
 The Neighbors by George Clark (1939–1971)
 Old Doc Yak by Sidney Smith (February 5, 1912 – June 22, 1919, December 7, 1930 – February 25, 1934) — second iteration as a weekly topper strip for The Gumps
 The Pink Panther by Eric and Bill Teitelbaum (2004-2009)
 Raising Hector by Peter Ramirez (2006-2010)
 Rick O'Shay by Stan Lynde (April 27, 1958 – March 8, 1981)
 Shoe by Jeff MacNelly and then others (1977–2008; moved to King Features Syndicate)
 Smitty by Walter Berndt (1922–1973)
 Smokey Stover by Bill Holman (1935–1973)

 Spy vs. Spy by Duck Edwing and Dave Manak (2002–2014)
 Sylvia (1981–2012)
 Tales of the Green Beret by Robin Moore & Joe Kubert (September 20, 1965 – 1968)
 The Teenie Weenies by William Donahey (June 14, 1914 – October 26, 1924; September 24, 1933 – December 2, 1934; May 18, 1941 – February 15, 1970)
 Terry and the Pirates (1934–1973) by Milton Caniff (1934–1946) and George Wunder (1946–1973)
 Texas Slim by Ferd Johnson (1925–1958)
 Tiny Tim by Stanley Link (July 23, 1933 – March 2, 1958)
 Whiteboy (later changed to Whiteboy in Skull Valley and then simply Skull Valley) by Garrett Price (Oct. 8, 1933–Aug. 16, 1936)
 Winnie Winkle (1920–1996) by Martin Branner (1920–1962), Max Van Bibber (1962–1980), and Frank Bolle (1980–1996)
 The World's Greatest Superheroes by numerous creators (1978–1985)

Editorial cartoons
 Nick Anderson
 Bill Bramhall
 Walt Handelsman
 Phil Hands
 David Horsey
 Joel Pett
 Drew Sheneman
 Scott Stantis
 Dana Summers
 Joey Weatherford

Columns and articles

Advice
 Ask Amy by Amy Dickinson
 God Squad, The by Marc Gellman
 Harvard Health Letters
 Interpersonal Edge by Daneen Skube
 Mayo Clinic Q & A
 Medicine Cabinet, The: Ask the Harvard Experts
 My Answer from the writings of the Rev. Billy Graham
 My Pet World by Cathy M. Rosenthal
 Real Estate Matters by Ilyce R. Glink and Samuel J. Tamkin
 Right Thing, The by Jeffrey L. Seglin

Business & Personal Finance
 Careers Now by Kathleen Furore
 Credit Card Chart, The
 Global Viewpoint Network by Nathan Gardels
 Interpersonal Edge by Daneen Skube
 Jill on Money by Jill Schlesinger
 Kids & Money by Steve Rosen
 Kiplinger Consumer News Service
 Kiplinger’s Money Power
 Markets & Mutual Funds
 Money Market Package
 Savings Game, The by Elliot Raphaelson
 Success featuring Kiplinger, Inc. Magazine and Fast Company
 Terry Savage
 Your Money by KiplingerEntertainment
Card games
 Daily Bridge Club by Frank Stewart
 Goren Bridge by Bob Jones
 Poker by Tony Dunst and Bryan Devonshire

Humor
 Dave Barry Year in Review by Dave Barry
 Humor Hotel by Greg Schwem
 Today’s Chuckle by Harlan Collins

Pop culture
 Bang Showbiz Cover Media Film Clips by The Chicago Tribune
 Rolling Stone Nielsen SoundScan Ranker Variety Entertainment News Service Video Games by GamerHub.TV

Sports
 Latest Line by J. McCarthy

Food
 America's Test Kitchen Entrée Feature Package featuring Environmental Nutrition, Eating Well, The Kitchn and Seriously Simple

Health
 Environmental Nutrition Harvard Health Letters How to Keep Well by Irving S. Cutter (1935–?)
 Mayo Clinic Q & A Medicine Cabinet, The: Ask the Harvard Experts Premium Health News Service by Various Contributors

Home
 Ask the Builder by Tim Carter
 Do It Yourself…Or Not? by Gene and Katie Hamilton
 Living Space by Better Homes & Gardens, Real Simple, Parents magazine, Midwest Living, and Southern Living Real Estate Matters by Ilyce R. Glink and Samuel J. Tamkin

Lifestyle
 24/7 Wall St. Ana Veciana-Suarez
 Drive, The Fresh Toast, The Linda C. Black Horoscopes by Nancy Black
 My Pet World by Cathy M. Rosenthal
 Tuesdays with Mitch by Mitch Albom
 Your Daily Astrology by Magi Helena

Magazines
 Atlantic, The Cut, The Defense One Fast Company Foreign Affairs Harvard Health Letters Inc. Magazine MIT Sloan Management Review & Report MIT Technology Review New Scientist New York Magazine Psychology Today Quartz Rolling Stone Variety Entertainment News Service VultureOpinion
 Bill Press
 Cal Thomas
 Clarence Page
 David Horsey
 Diplomat, The Gary Franks
 Global Viewpoint Network by Nathan Gardels
 Jonah Goldberg
 Mary Sanchez
 Oppenheimer Report, The by Andrés Oppenheimer
 Rachel Marsden
 Rev. Jesse Jackson
 Robert Koehler
 Robert Reich
 S. E. Cupp
 Victor Davis Hanson

Travel
 Celebrity Travel by Jae-Ha Kim
 Ed Perkins on Travel by Ed Perkins
 Rick Steves’ Europe by Rick Steves
 Taking the Kids by Eileen Ogintz

World News
 Atlantic, The Defense One Deutsche Welle Foreign Affairs Discontinued columns and columnists 

 Nancy Dorris: cooking (1930s)
 W. A. Evans, M.D.: health column (1919–1933)
 Little Old New York, by Ed Sullivan (1935–1940s)
 Danton Walker, column on Broadway theatre (1939–1940s)
 Clare Boothe Luce: national political convention coverage) (1940s)
 Beauty Answers by Antoinette Donnelly (1919–c. 1946)
 Doris Blake: Love Problems, Heart Chats, and Heart to Heart Talks (1921–1946)
 Mainly About Manhattan by John Chapman (1933–1946)
 Parent-Child by Gladys Bevans (1927—c. 1946)
 Rush & Malloy by George Rush and Joanna Molloy (?–2009)
 Inside the Video Games (?–2009)
 Samantha Power (?–2009)
 Paul A. Samuelson (?–2010)
 Test Drive by Jim Mateja (?–2010)
 Joe Galloway (?–2010)
 Eric Heiden (2009-2011)
 Kathy Kristof (?–2011)
 Swift Justice by Nancy Grace (2010-2011)
 Michael Showalter (?–2011)
 Naturally Savvy (?–2011)
 Jen Lancaster (2011)
 Social Studies by Julia Allison (2010-2011)
 Garrison Keillor (?–2012)
 Robyn Blumner (?–2013)
 Alexander Heffner (?–2013)
 Ta-Nehisi Coates (?–2013)
 Retire Smart (?–2014)
 Joel Brinkley (2014)
 Travel Troubleshooter by Christopher Elliott (?–2014)
 Andy Rooney (?–2014)
 Brazen Careerist (?–2014)
 William Pfaff (?–2015)
 a Google a Day (2011-2015)
 Jean Knows Cars by Jean Jennings (2015–2016)
 Steve Dale (?–2016)
 Kristyn Schiavone (2011-2016)
 So Social by Scott Kleinberg (?–2016)
 Apps of the Week (?–2016)
 Diane Farr (?–2016)
 Your Other 8 Hours by Robert Pagliarini (?–2016)
 Virtual Tourist (?–2016)
 Cultivating Life (?–2016)
 Ian Bremmer (?–2017)
 Frank Rich (?–2017)
 Global Events in Context by David Keys (?–2017)
 Liz Smith (?–2017)
 Mario Batali (2011–2017)
 Kids Doctor by Sue Hubbard, M.D. (?–2018)
 Anya Kamenetz (?–2018)
 One for the Table (?–2018)
 Paul Greenberg (?–2018)
 The Smart Collector by Danielle Arnet (?–2019)
 Global Economic Viewpoint by Nathan Gardels (?–2019)
 Henry Kissinger (?–2020)
 Paul Kennedy (?–2020)
 Simple Style by Aramide Esubi (?–2020)
 Wolfgang Puck's Kitchen by Wolfgang Puck (?–2020)
 Carl Hiassen (?–2021)
 Scopin the Soaps by Toby Goldstein (?–2021)
 John Kass (?–2021)
 Mary Schmich (?–2021)
 Rex Huppke (?–2022)
 Politics Today by Jules Witcover (?–2022)
 Leonard Pitts Jr. (?–2022)
 Daily Racing Form’s Consensus (?-2023)

Games & puzzles
Crosswords
 Daily Commuter Puzzle, The by Jackie Mathews
 Jumble Crosswords by David L. Hoyt
 Los Angeles Times Crossword Puzzle by Joyce Nichols Lewis and Rich Norris
 Quote-Acrostic TV Crossword, The by Jackie Mathews
Jumble games
 Jumble by David L. Hoyt and Jeff Knurek
 Jumble Crosswords by David L. Hoyt
 Jumble for Kids by David L. Hoyt and Jeff Knurek
 TV Jumble by David L. Hoyt
Logic puzzles
 Futoshiki / More or Less Hitori Junior Mind Gym Kakuro by Michael Mepham
 Killer Sudoku Killer Sudoku Pro Kubok Mind Gym Samurai Sudoku Sudoku Daily by Michael Mepham

Visual puzzles
 Spot the DifferenceWord puzzles
 ArrowWords Boggle BrainBusters by David L. Hoyt and Jeff Knurek
 Code-Cracker SCRABBLEgrams Word Salsa by Tony Tallarico
 Word WheelPremium Editions
 Brainbusters: The Ultimate Puzzle Book Envelope’s Oscar Preview, The Family Health Guide from Harvard Health Publications Guide to Entertaining: Be the Best Holiday Host This Year Guide to Fitness from Harvard Health Publications Guide to Investment from Morningstar Guide to Retirement from Morningstar Guide to Summer Entertaining International Travel Guide Life Skills: How to do almost anything Mayo Clinic Guide to Healthy Eating Pet Power Travel Guide U.S.A.''

See also
 List of newspaper comic strips

References

External links

Comic strip syndicates
Mass media companies of the United States
Comic strips syndicated by Tribune Content Agency
Dick Tracy
Tribune Publishing